The Eastern Mediterranean Council of Optometry has been founded in parallel to that of the World Council of Optometry to facilitate the development of optometry in the Eastern Mediterranean Region and support optometrists in promoting eye care services through advocacy, education, policy making, and humanitarian activities. The headquarter is located at Beirut, Lebanon.

References

Optometry
Medical associations